The 1892–93 season was Ardwick A.F.C.'s second season of league football. Following the amalgamation of the Football Alliance with the Football League, Ardwick was elected to the new Second Division in the inaugural season of two-tier football in England, and the season marked the start of Ardwick (Manchester City)'s exactly 100-year stay in the Football League before leaving in 1992 to co-found the Premier League.

Football League Second Division

Results summary

N.B. Points awarded for a win: 2

Reports

Cup competitions

FA Cup
The draw for the preliminary round and first round of the FA Cup was held at a meeting of the Football Association on 29 August 1892. Ardwick were drawn away at Fleetwood Rangers in the preliminary round, although Ardwick made an offer to Fleetwood to transfer the game to their own stadium, which was accepted. A first round home tie against Workington awaited the winners. The first match was drawn and Fleetwood refused to play extra time, forcing a replay, which was also held at Hyde Road.

Lancashire Senior Cup

Manchester Senior Cup

Friendlies

Squad statistics

Squad
Appearances for competitive matches only

Scorers

All

League

FA Cup

Transfers

Transfers in

See also
Manchester City F.C. seasons

References

External links
Extensive Manchester City statistics site

1892-93
English football clubs 1892–93 season